The Waters of Mormon, in the 18th chapter of the Book of Mosiah (in The Book of Mormon), is a body of water where about two hundred Nephites were baptized.

Summary

Soon after the second Nephite evacuation of Lehi-Nephi, these Nephites were en route to Zarahemla when they came to "a place which was called Mormon, having received its name from the king, being in the borders of the land having been infested, by times or at seasons, by wild beasts." This place of Mormon contained a beautiful fountain of pure water" near which the prophet Alma—a fugitive from King Noah's court—"did hide himself in the daytime from the searches of the king" and preached the Gospel of Jesus Christ to "as many as believed him".

"[A]fter many days," a "goodly number" of people had "gathered together at the place of Mormon, to hear the words of Alma." Alma was no doubt moved by his audience's willingness to "[believe] on his word"; thus, he encouraged each of them to have faith, repent, and be baptized unto Christ. "And it came to pass that he said unto them: Behold, here are the waters of Mormon (for thus were they called) and now, as ye are desirous to come into the fold of God, and to be called his people, … what have you against being baptized in the name of the Lord…?"

As Alma's audience agreed, the prophet descended into the waters of Mormon and began his work by first baptizing a man named Helam. During the baptism of Helam, "both Alma and Helam were buried in the water," as Alma renewed his own covenant with the Lord while also serving as example for his followers. He then proceeded to baptize "every one that went forth to the place of Mormon; and they were in number about two hundred and four souls; yea, and they were baptized in the waters of Mormon, and were filled with the grace of God. And they were called … the church of Christ, from that time forward. And it came to pass that whosoever was baptized by the power and authority of God was added to his church".

Latter-day Saint scholar David Lamb, of the "Ancient America Foundation", argues that these events form the true source of the title of the Book of Mormon. According to Lamb, the prophet Mormon was named after the Land of Mormon, which thus became the font from which the Book of Mormon's title sprang (see ).

Location
According to the Mesoamerican limited geography model, the Waters of Mormon include Lake Atitlán in the highlands of Guatemala. According to the limited New York setting, the Waters of Mormon were located near the eastern shore of Lake Erie, identified as the Book of Mormon's "west sea".

However, proponents of the Heartland Model have claimed Big Spring, in Missouri, as being the Waters of Mormon.

References

Baptism
Book of Mormon places
Book of Mormon studies
Water and religion